Oak Island is an island located in Lunenburg County, Nova Scotia. It is known for the Oak Island mystery—claims of buried treasure and unexplained objects being found on the island.

Oak Island may also refer to:

Places
Listed alphabetically by province or state

Canada
 Oak Island (Manitoba), a settlement in the Rural Municipality of Taché
 Oak Island (Nova Scotia), the original location of New Minas, Nova Scotia

United States
 Oak Island (Minnesota), an island and unincorporated community in Lake of the Woods County
 Oak Island (New York), an island in the St. Lawrence River in Hammond, New York
 Oak Island, New York, a hamlet of the town of Babylon, New York
 Oak Island (North Carolina), a barrier island in Brunswick County
 Oak Island, North Carolina, a town on the island
 Oak Island (Oregon), alternate name of Hog Island (Oregon), an island in the Willamette River in Clackamas County
 Oak Island (South Carolina), a historic plantation house in Charleston County
 Oak Island (Texas), an unincorporated community in Chambers County
 Oak Island (Washington), an island in Washington state now known as Reach Island
 Oak Island (Wisconsin), an island in Lake Superior

Other uses

 Oak Island (EP), an album by the American band Our Last Night
 Oak Island Golf Club, a golf club located at Caswell Beach, North Carolina
 Oak Island Life Saving Station, a historic life saving station at Caswell Beach, North Carolina
 Oak Island Light, a lighthouse on Caswell Beach, North Carolina
 Oak Island Yard, a rail facility in Newark, New Jersey
 The Curse of Oak Island, a History channel television series

See also

Ekerö, an urban area in Sweden that translates to Oak Island
Island oak (disambiguation)